Ra'na was a village located approximately 26 km northwest of Hebron. It was occupied by the Israeli army during Operation Yo'av in October 1948. It was one of 16 villages in the Hebron district that were depopulated.

History
In 1838, during the  Ottoman empire, Edward Robinson noted it as  Muslim village, located in the Gaza district. He further reported that the fields of Ra'na were planted with tobacco and cotton.

In 1863 Victor Guérin described it as a "village now reduced to a few huts, but that once had been much more considerable, judging by two beautiful wells dug in the rock and by a number of great stones scattered here and there".
An Ottoman village list of about 1870 showed that   Ra'na had  8 houses and a population of 30, though the population count included men, only. 

In  1882,  the PEF's Survey of Western Palestine  described   Ra'na  as a village built of stone and adobe, and it had a pool and gardens.

In 1896 the population of Ra'na was estimated to be about 99 persons.

British Mandate era
Ra'na was classified as  hamlet  by the Palestine Index Gazetteer. In the 1922 census of Palestine conducted  by the British Mandate authorities, Ra'ana had a population of 126 inhabitants, all Muslims, increasing in  the 1931 census to 150, still all Muslim, in a total of  36 inhabited houses.

In 1945 statistics the population of Ra'na was  190, all Muslims. In 1944/45 a total of 5,882 dunums of land was  planted with cereals, while 112 dunums were irrigated or used for orchards. Grain was the dominant crop, but during the final year of the British Mandate of Palestine,  the villagers also grew grapes, carob and olives.  14  dunams were classified as built-up (urban) areas.

The kibbutz of Gal On was established in 1946 on what had traditionally been village land.

1948, and after
The village was attacked by the Giv'ati Brigade on 22–23 October 1948. Those villagers who had not already fled were expelled and the village destroyed.

Following the war, the area was incorporated into the State of Israel. Palestinian historian Walid Khalidi described that the site of the village in 1992: "The site is fenced in with barbed wire and is overgrown in part by cactuses, especially where there is limestone soil, and by carob trees. No houses or rubble remains."

People from Ra'na
Ata Abu Rashta

See also
Depopulated Palestinian locations in Israel

References

Bibliography

External links
Welcome  to Ra'na 
Ra'na, Zochrot
Survey of Western Palestine, Map 16:     IAA, Wikimedia commons 
Rana from the Khalil Sakakini Cultural Center

Arab villages depopulated during the 1948 Arab–Israeli War
District of Hebron